Steven Goldman may refer to:

 Steven L. Goldman (born 1941), professor in humanities at Lehigh University
 Steven M. Goldman, Commissioner of Banking and Insurance of New Jersey, 2006-2009
 Steve Goldman (born 1945), American financial advisor and former gridiron football coach

See also
 Steven Goldmann, Canadian music video and film director